Pentagalloyl glucose may refer to:
 1,2,3,4,6-Pentagalloyl-glucose
 6-Digalloyl-1,2,3-trigalloyl-glucose